"Runaway Love" is a song by American R&B/pop group En Vogue, released in September 1993 as the first single from their extended play (EP) Runaway Love. After the huge success of their album Funky Divas, the single was released. The song was written and produced by Thomas McElroy and Denzil Foster. Group members, Cindy Herron and Terry Ellis share lead vocals, Dawn Robinson leads on the bridge, and spoken intro is by Maxine Jones. Elroy and Foster contributed vocals and spoken rap, their known as the alias FMob group.

Reception

Critical reception
Stephen Thomas Erlewine from AllMusic complimented the song as "great". Larry Flick from Billboard stated that here, the group are "stretching out nicely over a cool midtempo groove, juiced with the same quasi-hip-hop/funk flavors that fueled "Hold On" and "My Lovin'." He commented that those "warm and distinctive harmonies feel like a welcome visit from an old friend, while multiple lead vocals are appropriately diva-like, without an overload of hype." Troy J. Augusto from Cashbox said it's a "comfortably groovin' song, seemingly familiar the first time you hear it, features all four Vogue'rs doing what they do best—melting hearts." He added, "Super confident vocals, En Vogue's bread and butter, will propel "Runaway Love" to the top of all the appropriate charts and playlists. Don't miss this one." James Earl Hardy from Entertainment Weekly wrote that the song "prove [that] these divas have more in common with the Emotions and the Sweet Inspirations than with the Supremes." 

Dave Sholin from the Gavin Report complimented the writers for continuing to "demonstrate their production genius". Another editor, Kelly Woo called the song "a masterpiece of harmony and tight production that captures the energy of their earlier works. Their vocal performance is incomparable and uncompromising-perfection!" Pan-European magazine Music & Media noted that with "one foot in history and the other one in the swingbeat era, these girls are moving closer to becoming the Pointer Sisters of our time." Ralph Tee from Music Weeks RM Dance Update stated that the group "have never sounded sweeter than on this stylish, lilting two stepper with harmonies to send shivers down the spine." Another editor, James Hamilton described it as a "funkily wukka-wukked mumbling and cooing slinky roller". James Hunter from Vibe complimented "the gorgeus skating harmonies" on this "groove".

Commercial reception
The single was released to radio in late August 1993 and was immediately added to airplay rotation, debuting on the Hot 100 Airplay at #31 the week of September 4, 1993. The physical single was not released until almost two months later, after maximum airplay had been reached, resulting in the failure of the single to peak within the Top 40 of the Billboard Hot 100.

Failure of the single to chart higher was possibly due to "Runaway Love" initially being available only on the EP. The EP had been released shortly after the single was issued and was considered an album not a single. However, the single manage to peak within the Top 20 on US Pop and US R&B airplay.

Formats and track listings

 UK 7" single"Runaway Love" (Radio Edit) – 4:16
"Runaway Love" (Hype Mix) – 4:57

 UK CD single"Runaway Love" (Radio Edit) – 4:06
"Runaway Love" (Extended Version) – 5:36
"What Is Love" (Club Mix) – 5:36
"Desire" (Dancehall Remix) – 3:56

 US CD single"Runaway Love" (Hip Hop Vocal Remix Edit) – 4:10
"Runaway Love" (Hip Hop Vocal Remix Edit W/O Rap) – 4:10
"Runaway Love" (Hip Hop Vocal Remix) – 5:02
"Runaway Love" (Theo's Bad Intentions Radio Edit) – 4:48
"Runaway Love" (Theo's Bad Intentions Club Mix) – 7:06

 US CD single'
"Runaway Love" (Radio Edit) – 4:06
"Runaway Love" (E.P. Version) – 4:55
"Runaway Love" (Extended Version) – 5:35
"Runaway Love" (Hype Mix) – 4:57
"Runaway Love" (FMob Instrumental) – 4:51

Personnel
Backing Vocals – Maxine Jones
Guitar – Marlon McClain
Lead Vocals, Backing Vocals – Cindy Herron, Dawn Robinson, Terry Ellis
Keyboards, Drum Programming – Denzil Foster, Thomas McElroy
Mixed, Engineer – Ken Kessie
Production coordinator – Angela Skinner, Marie McElroy 
Producer, Executive-Producer – Thomas McElroy and Denzil Foster

Charts

References

External links
 Runaway Love Featuring FMob (EP Version), MP3
 En Vogue Featuring FMob - Runaway Love (CD)

1993 singles
En Vogue songs
Songs written by Denzil Foster
Songs written by Thomas McElroy
East West Records singles
1993 songs